Sanjeev Parmar (born May 28, 1978) is a Canadian former soccer player who played in the USISL D-3 Pro League, and Canadian Professional Soccer League who currently is head coach and founder of Ottawa club St. Anthony SC's Futuro Soccer Academy programme.

Playing career
Parmar began playing soccer at the college level with Houghton College for four years where he was a three time All-American. In 2000, he was drafted by the Toronto Lynx of the USL A-League, but signed a contract with the Charlotte Eagles of the USISL D-3 Pro League. He featured in six matches for Charlotte, and managed to win the league title. Parmar traveled to Rwanda, Ethiopia, and Kenya on a pre-season tour to Africa, where he remained an additional three months in Ethiopia on a Christian mission.

Parmar returned to Canada in 2001 to sign with expansion franchise Ottawa Wizards of the Canadian Professional Soccer League. He scored his first goal on June 16, 2001 in an Open Canada Cup match against the Durham Flames in a 2–2 draw. He made the CPSL Al-Star roster which faced C.S. Marítimo in a friendly match. In his first season with Ottawa he managed to win the double by finishing first in the league standings and claiming the Open Canada Cup. The following season Parmar suffered a concussion causing him to miss the majority of the season, but he returned for the remainder of the season to win the treble with Ottawa. During his injury he managed to acquire a coaching A-license the youngest Canadian player to obtain a high level coaching license.

In 2012 Parmar founded Parmar Futuro, a soccer team based in Ottawa.

Honors

Charlotte Eagles
 USISL D-3 Pro League Champions (1): 2000

Ottawa Wizards
CPSL Championship (1): 2002
Open Canada Cup (2): 2001, 2002
Canadian Professional Soccer League Eastern Conference Champions (2): 2001, 2002

References 

1978 births
Living people
Canadian Soccer League (1998–present) players
Canadian soccer players
Canadian expatriate soccer players
Charlotte Eagles players
People from Campbell River, British Columbia
Soccer people from British Columbia
Ottawa Wizards players
USL Second Division players
Association football midfielders